John Fitz-John was the seventh Archdeacon of Totnes.

References

Archdeacons of Totnes